Omegaverse, also known as A/B/O (an abbreviation for "alpha/beta/omega"), is a subgenre of speculative erotic fiction, and originally a subgenre of erotic slash fan fiction. Its premise is that a dominance hierarchy exists in humans, which are divided into dominant "alphas", neutral "betas", and submissive "omegas". This hierarchy determines how people interact with one another in romantic, erotic and sexual contexts.

Genre characteristics
The Omegaverse has abstract premises for which it could be considered a fantasy genre according to the conventions established by Todorov, but the high specification of its characteristic elements suggests that it could also be considered a literary genre in itself. Its main peculiarity is that characters have two genders: a main one (male or female), decided by their external sexual organs, and a secondary one, that manifests during puberty, determined by their internal reproductive system. It's usually chosen from one of the following, each of which also corresponds to some distinctive character traits:
 Alpha (α): socially (and in some interpretations, even biologically) dominant, physically built, short-tempered and a natural leader;
 Beta (β): depending on the story, they are regular human beings, or have a mix of Alpha and Omega traits, or their own unique traits;
 Omega (Ω): submissive and gentle, calm and a peacemaker.

Omegaverse fiction typically focuses on wolf or other canid-like behavior in humans, especially as it pertains to sexual intercourse and sexuality, which is described as instinctual, responding to animalistic physiological stimuli. This includes rutting and heat cycles, pheromonal attraction between Alphas and Omegas, penises with knots (used to "knot", or tie, the partner to an Alpha during copulation, an action known as "knotting"), scent marking, imprinting, breeding, mating rites, pack structures and potentially permanent psychic bonds with a mate. Between Alphas and Betas, only females can carry on a pregnancy, but male Omegas are often envisaged as being able to become pregnant via a uterus connected to the rectum, and Alphas can impregnate regardless of their main gender.  To make penetration and impregnation easier, male Omegas often have self-lubricating anuses.

Since Omegaverse is a type of folksonomy, some of its aspects are included or excluded at the discretion of the story author. Sometimes Betas are absent, or other intermediate designations such as Deltas and Gammas are added. The genre often features other fantasy elements, such as the presence of werewolves or other fantastical creatures. Some works introduce a rigid caste system, where Alphas are depicted as the upper class elites while Omegas are at the bottom tier and face discrimination and oppression because of their physiology, creating an example of biological determinism. In darker stories, this results in non-consensual or dubiously consensual intercourses, forced pregnancies, Omegas kidnapping and sexual slavery.

Omegaverse works are most frequently focused on male-male couples composed of an Alpha and an Omega, though heterosexual Omegaverse works have been produced, and by 2013, about 10% were labeled male/female. Some subvert the genre tropes, telling stories about illicit relationships between Alphas, Omegas who hide their smell using chemical pheromones so that they are not a victim of biological prejudices, or dominant Omegas and submissive Alphas. Non-traditional couples are often featured in Japanese Omegaverse works.

While the terms "A/B/O" and "Omegaverse" can be used interchangeably, the first one often refers only to the sexual dynamics, while the second one is preferred when the story is set in a new ideological world. Some prefer to avoid use of the term "A/B/O" as its spelling resembles a racial slur towards Aboriginal Australians.

History
Professor Kristina Busse has described Omegaverse as a "seemingly perfect storm" of tropes that already existed in fandoms. For example, the 1967 episode "Amok Time" of the American television series Star Trek introduces the concept of pon farr, the Vulcan mating cycle wherein Vulcan males must mate or die. Pon farr became a popular plot concept for fan works in the Star Trek fandom, particularly fan fiction focused on the Kirk/Spock pairing. The concept of mating and heat cycles among humans was subsequently adopted by other fandoms, and later became a staple of the Omegaverse subgenre. Ursula K. Le Guin also wrote, in her 1969 novel The Left Hand of Darkness, about an extraterrestrial androgynous world with hermaphroditic characters and mating cycles named kemmer.

The origin of the Omegaverse is typically attributed to the fandom surrounding the American television series Supernatural, as a fusion between werewolves and the male pregnancy subgenre of erotic fan fiction. Another source of inspiration could have been the science fiction drama Dark Angel, where Supernatural actor Jensen Ackles plays a soldier with feline DNA, and female characters go into heat. The first works recognized as A/B/O were published in mid-2010: that year in May, a writing prompt was shared on a LiveJournal community dedicated to Supernatural, mentioning "alpha" males having knots on their penises, and "bitch males" without the knots, inspiring user tehdirtiestsock to write I ain't no lady, but you'd be the tramp, a real person fiction work focused on actors Jared Padalecki and Jensen Ackles as an Alpha and an Omega, which was published on July 24. Despite not using the term "omega", the story created many of the characteristics later associated with the Omegaverse genre. 

Over the next few months, other anonymous authors shared similar stories, until on November 9 a new writing prompt mentioned Alpha, Beta and Omega men for the first time, spurring the creation of three works. By June 2011, the term "Omegaverse" and its dynamics had become commonplace; the following month, the first femslash Omegaverse work was published, and the first use of the tropes outside the Supernatural fandom was recorded. 

The genre subsequently expanded in popularity to other fan communities: first to those focused around Sherlock and X-Men: First Class, then it quickly reached other fandoms like those of television series Hannibal, Teen Wolf, Glee, Doctor Who and movie The Avengers. A Chinese translation of an A/B/O Sherlock fanfic posted on website Suiyuanju around October 2011 introduced Omegaverse to Chinese slash fan circles, from which it spread to danmei original novels.

In 2012, the notion of "fated mates" was introduced. In 2014 it gained strong traction in Japan, acquiring market value with the publication of the first A/B/O manga in 2015. In 2016 the discrimination and power dynamics between Alphas, Betas and Omegas began to be outlined, and the idea of the mark or bite that chemically and biologically links couples together was created, while in 2018 the concept of the "inner wolf", an animal instinct guiding Alphas and Omegas, arose. Through her work Kanraku Alpha Enigma, manga artist Shinshi Nakai subsequently tried to add the "Enigma", a new type of character who can mutate their secondary gender, but the novelty was resisted by Omegaverse fans and had no impact or continuity.

Reception and analysis 
Omegaverse has become both extremely popular and controversial in fandom circles. Some condemn it as revolting and sick, affirming that it reinforces patriarchal values and a rape culture, objecting to its roots in bestiality fiction and the power imbalances between genders. Conversely, others appreciate how it deconstructs bodies and gender roles, offering subversive social commentary on queer identity and oppression.

Academic opinions are equally divided between those who believe Omegaverse shows a new type of gender essentialism combined with homophobic and heteronormative elements, and those who see the space to give it a transgender reading. Delgado Díaz, Ubillus Breña and Cappello do not believe that the Omegaverse is linked to queer theory or transexuality, despite containing allegories to gender identity and the female condition (Omegas, both male and female, could be considered embodiments of the traditional role of women as housewifes and mothers), whose purpose, however, is only that of frameworks to plots ranging from melodrama to horror. According to researcher Milena Popova, "the features of the A/B/O genre allow for the exploration of themes of power, desire, pleasure, intimacy, romance, control, and consent in a variety of ways", and it's used by writers and readers "as a tool to articulate and think through consent issues in unequal relationships". Similarly, Laura Campillo Arnaiz argues that dark Omegaverse works serve to gain control on the feelings of helplessness and humiliation that characterize it, creating a cathartic experience.

Angie Fazekas wrote that "[i]n the omegaverse, fans use traditional tropes of gender and sexuality to imagine a universe where queer sexuality is the norm and normative gender roles are often skewed and upended", but that they fail to offer real progressiveness since, like most of the other fan fictions, their works are predominantly focused on relationships between white men.

Impact
The Omegaverse exploded in popularity in 2017, quickly becoming a frequent subject of fan fiction writers. , over 39,000 Omegaverse fan works had been published on the fan fiction website Archive of Our Own, and over 70,000 as of 2020. In addition to these derivative works, Omegaverse has emerged as its own genre of original commercial erotic fiction: roughly 200 Omegaverse novels were published on Amazon from January to June 2020. It has also become a subgenre of both commercial and non-commercial  (manga featuring male-male couples). Given the positive reception in Japan, South Korea started its own production of Omegaverse manhwas, as well as China, although the censorship applied in this latter country has limited the genre popularity.

Beginning in 2017, the "Dom/Sub Universe" subgenre gained popularity, particularly in yaoi works in Japan; it uses BDSM elements, positing dominant and submissive as secondary genders, and draws inspirations from Omegaverse in its depiction of caste systems. In the Korean "Cakeverse", a small part of the human population is divided into "forks", who have no sense of taste, and "cakes", people with a particular flavor that makes them irresistible to "forks".

Copyright lawsuit
In 2016, author Addison Cain released Born to be Bound, the first novel of a series adapted from one of her fan fictions that features Omegaverse genre tropes. In April 2018, Cain and her publisher Blushing Books filed a Digital Millennium Copyright Act (DMCA) notice against author Zoey Ellis for her 2018 novel Crave to Conquer. Cain accused Ellis of plagiarism and copyright infringement, arguing that both Born to be Bound and Crave to Conquer focus on a central couple that is an Omega female and Alpha male, and include the concepts of Omegas hiding their secondary sex by use of suppressants, and Omegas being rare and valued mates. The first two installments of Ellis' series were removed from online sellers for several months, and the pre-orders of the third installment were cancelled, as a result of the DMCA claim.

Ellis and her publisher Quill Ink Books subsequently brought a lawsuit against Cain and Blushing Books for damages due to lost revenue and reputational harm, with representation from Quill Ink contending that Cain had no legitimate claim of ownership over the Omegaverse genre. Blushing Books settled in 2019, admitting that there had been no plagiarisms or copyright infringements, and paid an undisclosed monetary amount in damages to both Quill Ink and Ellis. In September 2019, Ellis and Quill Ink filed a separate civil lawsuit against Cain, arguing that the DMCA copyright claim was false and malicious; the lawsuit was dismissed by a Virginia court in 2019. The lawsuits were covered by The New York Times, which noted that a decision in Cain's favor could have set a significant legal precedent for commercial works based on fan-generated material; the Times further noted the case as an example of "how easily intellectual property law can be weaponized by authors seeking to take down their rivals."

Notes

References

Bibliography 
 
 
 
 
 

Fan fiction
Slash fiction
Erotic fiction
Sexuality in fiction
Romance genres
Fantasy genres